Albuginaceae is a family of oomycetes.

Genera and species
Albuginaceae contains the following subtaxa:
Albugo 
Albugo achyranthis
Albugo aechmantherae
Albugo arenosa
Albugo austroafricana
Albugo candida 
Albugo capparis 
Albugo chardoni 
Albugo caldothricis
Albugo cynoglossi
Albugo eomeconis
Albugo eurotiae
Albugo evansii
Albugo evolvuli 
Albugo froelichiae
Albugo gomphrenae 
Albugo hesleri 
Albugo hohenheimia 
Albugo hyoscyami
Albugo ipomoeae-aquaticae
Albugo ipomoeae-hardwickii
Albugo ipomoeae-panduratae 
Albugo keeneri
Albugo koreana
Albugo laibachii 
Albugo leimonios 
Albugo lepidii 
Albugo lepigoni 
Albugo macalpineana
Albugo mangenotii
Albugo mauginii 
Albugo mesembryanthemi
Albugo minor
Albugo molluginis
Albugo occidentalis 
Albugo pes-tigridis
Albugo pileae
Albugo polygoni
Albugo portulacearum
Albugo pratapi
Albugo pulverulentus
Albugo quadrata
Albugo resedae 
Albugo rorippae 
Albugo sibirica
Albugo solivae
Albugo solivarum
Albugo thlaspeos
Albugo tillaeae
Albugo trianthemae 
Albugo tropica 
Albugo voglmayrii
Albugo wasabiae
Pustula 
Pustula brasiliensis
Pustula cancriniae
Pustula centaurii 
Pustula chardiniae
Pustula helianthicola 
Pustula hydrocotyles
Pustula junggarensis 
Pustula spinulosa 
Pustula tragopogonis 
Pustula xinyuanensis
Wilsoniana 
Wilsoniana achyranthis 
Wilsoniana amaranthi 
Wilsoniana bliti 
Wilsoniana platensis 
Wilsoniana portulacae

References

 
Water mould plant pathogens and diseases